James Allan (born 1960) is a Canadian-Australian law professor and writer. He is the Garrick Professor of Law at the University of Queensland.

Professor Allan is an avid supporter of Donald Trump and calls for the Republicans to nominate Trump. 

Allan has degrees from Queen's University, the London School of Economics and the University of Hong Kong. He qualified as a barrister and solicitor with The Law Society of Upper Canada in 1988. Prior to his appointment at the University of Queensland, Allan taught at the University of Otago.As a legal scholar, Allan is well-known for his skepticism regarding bills of rights.Allan writes opinion pieces in The Australian newspaper. He is author of Democracy in Decline: Steps in the Wrong Direction, occasional contributor to Quadrant magazine and The Spectator and editor of the University of Queensland Law Journal. As a columnist for The Spectator Australia, he has supported the view that Joe Biden’s victory in the 2020 US presidential election was marked by voting irregularities; that the election was potentially flawed because of extensive mail-in voting and a lack of ballot security.

References

Living people
1960 births
Canadian expatriates in Australia
Queen's University at Kingston alumni
Alumni of the London School of Economics
Alumni of the University of Hong Kong
Academic staff of the University of Otago
Academic staff of the University of Queensland
Academic journal editors
Lawyers in Ontario